Lisa M. Coussens is an American cancer scientist who is Chair of the Department of Cell, Developmental and Cancer Biology and Professor and Associate Director for Basic Research in the Knight Cancer Institute at the Oregon Health & Science University. She serves as President of the American Association for Cancer Research.

Early life and education 
Coussens was an undergraduate student at San Francisco State University. She moved to the University of California, Los Angeles for her doctoral research, where she studied JUNB expression. She was a postdoctoral researcher working with Douglas Hanahan at the University of California, San Francisco. She worked at Genentech on the HER2 proto-oncogene.

Research and career 
Coussens' research considers immune therapies for cancer treatment. To do this, she looks at how immune cells regulate aspects of tumor cell development and the role of leukocytes. She makes use of mesothelioma mouse models to identify the immune-regulated pathways that may be susceptible to therapeutic targeting.

Coussens showed that some immune cells are hijacked to promote tumor growth and metastasis. She uncovered the intra-cellular communication processes which cause tumor cells to trigger T cells to recruit macrophages to early tumors. Macrophages are white blood cells that are usually involved with clearing debris, but produce epidermal growth factors when they are close to tumor cells, which promotes the proliferation and invasion of tumor cells. Her resesarch has emphasized the need to understand the tumor microenvironment in understanding cancer progression. She showed that dying cancer cells release factors that induce a CD8+ T-cell mediated immune response against cancer.

In 2022, Coussens was elected President of the American Association for Cancer Research.

Awards and honors 
 2001 American Association for Cancer Research Gertrude B. Elion Award 
 2012 AACR-Women in Cancer Research Charlotte Friend Memorial Lectureship 
 2015 National Cancer Institute 13th Rosalind E. Franklin Award 
 2018 Doctor in Medicine from the University of Buenos Aires
 2018 12th AACR-Princess Takamatsu Memorial Lectureship 
 2018 Career Award from the European Academy of Tumour Immunology
 2018 Susan G. Komen Brinker Award for Scientific Distinction in Basic Science
 2018 Elected as Fellow of the American Association for the Advancement of Science 
 2019 Elected Fellow of the American Association for Cancer Research Academy
 2022 Elected President of the American Association for Cancer Research

Selected publications

References 

Living people
University of California, Los Angeles alumni
San Francisco State University alumni
Oregon Health & Science University faculty
Fellows of the AACR Academy
Cancer researchers
American women scientists
Year of birth missing (living people)